The 2018 PDC Asian Tour series was the inaugural staging of the Asian Tour, and consisted of 12 darts tournaments on the 2018 PDC Pro Tour.

Plans were announced in early 2018 for a full Asian Tour, with qualifying places for the 2018 Shanghai Darts Masters and the 2019 PDC World Darts Championship up for grabs too.

Prize money
Each event will have a prize fund of $10,060.

This is how the prize money is divided:

March

Event 1
Event 1 was contested on Saturday 10 March 2018 at KBS Sports World in Seoul, South Korea.

Event 2
Event 2 was contested on Sunday 11 March 2018 at KBS Sports World in Seoul, South Korea.

April

Event 3
Event 3 was contested on Saturday 28 April 2018 at the Regency Art Hotel in Macau.

Event 4
Event 4 was contested on Sunday 29 April 2018 at the Regency Art Hotel in Macau.

June

Event 5
Event 5 was contested on Saturday 23 June 2018 at Kobe Port Terminal in Kobe, Japan.

Event 6
Event 6 was contested on Sunday 24 June 2018 at Kobe Port Terminal in Kobe, Japan.

August

Event 7
Event 7 was contested on Saturday 18 August 2018 at Grand Centro Ballroom in Kuala Lumpur, Malaysia.

Event 8
Event 8 was contested on Sunday 19 August 2018 at Grand Centro Ballroom in Kuala Lumpur, Malaysia.

Event 9
Event 9 was contested on Saturday 8 September 2018 at G Club in Taipei, Taiwan.

Event 10
Event 10 was contested on Sunday 9 September 2018 at G Club in Taipei, Taiwan.

Event 11
Event 11 was contested on Saturday 13 October 2018 at Crown Plaza Manila Galleria Ballroom in Manila, Philippines.

Event 12
Event 12 was contested on Sunday 14 October 2018 at Crown Plaza Manila Galleria Ballroom in Manila, Philippines.

References

2018 in darts
2018 PDC Pro Tour